Jennifer Oster (born 2 March 1986) is a retired German footballer.

Honours

FCR 2001 Duisburg
 Bundesliga: Runner-up 2004–05, 2005–06, 2006–07, 2007–08, 2009–10
 German Cup: Winner 2008–09, 2009–10, Runner-up 2006–07
 UEFA Women's Cup: Winner 2008–09

References

External links
 
 

1986 births
Living people
People from Moers
Sportspeople from Düsseldorf (region)
Footballers from North Rhine-Westphalia
German women's footballers
Women's association football midfielders
FCR 2001 Duisburg players
MSV Duisburg (women) players
21st-century German women